Velika Župa is a former village in the municipality of Prijepolje, Serbia. Since 1979, it belongs to the settlement Kovačevac.

References

Populated places in Zlatibor District